The 1979–80 season was the 34th season in Rijeka’s history and their 18th season in the Yugoslav First League. Their 10th place finish in the 1978–79 season meant it was their sixth successive season playing in the Yugoslav First League.

Competitions

Yugoslav First League

Classification

Results summary

Results by round

Matches

First League

Source: rsssf.com

Yugoslav Cup

Source: rsssf.com

Cup Winners' Cup

Source: worldfootball.net

Squad statistics
Competitive matches only.

See also
1979–80 Yugoslav First League
1979–80 Yugoslav Cup
1979–80 European Cup Winners' Cup

References

External sources
 1979–80 Yugoslav First League at rsssf.com
 Prvenstvo 1979.-80. at nk-rijeka.hr

HNK Rijeka seasons
Rijeka